William Burnside Buffum (September 10, 1921 – April 13, 2012) was an official in the United States Department of State.

Biography
Buffum was born in Binghamton, New York on September 10, 1921.  He served in the United States Army during World War II.  He later joined the United States Foreign Service. Buffum served on the staffs of Ambassadors Arthur Goldberg and Charles W. Yost at the United States Mission to the United Nations. In 1970, President of the United States Richard Nixon nominated Buffum as United States Ambassador to Lebanon and Buffum held this post until 1974. Nixon then nominated Buffum as Assistant Secretary of State for International Organization Affairs; Buffum held this office from February 4, 1974, until December 18, 1975. In the later 1970s, Buffum was Under-Secretary-General of the United Nations for Political and General Assembly Affairs.

Buffum died on April 13, 2012, at his house on the island of Hawaii.

References
Profile on the Political Graveyard
Obituary, San Jose Mercury News

1921 births
2012 deaths
United States Assistant Secretaries of State
Ambassadors of the United States to Lebanon
American officials of the United Nations
United States Army personnel of World War II
People from Binghamton, New York
United States Foreign Service personnel
United States Army soldiers